The  refers to a political rally that took place in Tokyo, Japan, on June 22, 1908.

In the mixed political climate of the late Meiji and early Taishō period, celebrated political activist and anarchist Koken Yamaguchi was discharged from a term in prison. The police attacked and suppressed the small demonstration, and ten prominent activists, including Ōsugi Sakae, Hitoshi Yamakawa, Kanno Sugako, and Kanson Arahata, were arrested.

In later trials, most of the arrested were found guilty and received sentences of one year or more, with Ōsugi receiving the longest prison term (of two and a half years). Although a relatively minor event in the complicated history of Meiji politics, it gained notability later, when the incarceration of certain participants in the rally (including Ōsugi, Yamakawa and Arahata) protected them from being involved in a much more prominent crackdown, the High Treason Incident, which resulted in a number of activists being sentenced to death.

This incident marked the start of stronger government action against the socialist movement in Japan.

See also
 Katsura Tarō

References

Anarchism in Japan
Anti-anarchism
1908 in Japan
Politics of the Empire of Japan
Meiji socialism